The Duke Blue Devils women's lacrosse team is an NCAA Division I college lacrosse team representing Duke University as part of the Atlantic Coast Conference. They play their home games at Koskinen Stadium in Durham, North Carolina.

Historical statistics
*Statistics through 2018 season

Individual career records

Reference:

Individual single-season records

Seasons

Postseason Results

The Blue Devils have appeared in 19 NCAA tournaments. Their postseason record is 24-19.

References